Brenda Lea Bohmer (born March 30, 1957 in Camrose, Alberta, Canada) is a Canadian curler.

Awards
Sandra Schmirler Most Valuable Player Award:

Teams and events

References

External links
 
 Brenda Bohmer - Curling Canada Stats Archive
 

Living people
1957 births
People from Camrose, Alberta
Curlers from Alberta
Canadian women's curling champions